A whip stitch is a simple sewing stitch that is used in crocheting, knitting and sewing, and in which the needle is passed in and out of the fabric in a series of stitches that circle an edge of the fabric. In hand sewing, this stitch can be used to create a seam but can also be used for joining two felt pieces together. Whip stitching creates a nice edge and prevents the fabric from unraveling.

It is similar to the blanket stitch as it is a form of hand sewing stitch that helps in finishing edges.

Other uses 
The whip stitch is often used in applique making, closing the sides of pillows and cushions, hemming jeans, attaching crocheted amigurumi toys together as it produces a neat seam, and in leather lacing as a decorative stitch in leather garments and accessories.

See also 

 Blanket stitch
 Overcast stitch
 Sewing stitches

References 

Sewing stitches
Embroidery stitches
Sewing stitches
Sewing
Embroidery stitches